Keith DeFini is a retired American soccer midfielder who played professionally in the National Professional Soccer League and USISL.

Youth
Born in Ohio, DeFini grew up in McKinney, Texas.  He attended Creighton University, playing on the men's soccer team from 1990 to 1993.  He was a 1993 First Team All American.

Professional
In December 1993, the Detroit Rockers of the National Professional Soccer League drafted DeFini in the first round. He never made a first team appearance before returning to the United States.  During the summer of 1994, DeFini played for the CCV Hydra in the USISL.  On November 15, 1994, the Kansas City Attack traded their 1994 first round draft pick to the Rockers for the rights to DeFini.  DeFini immediately signed with the Attack.  In May 1995, he moved outdoors with the Hampton Roads Mariners of the USISL.  By July, he was playing for the Greensboro Dynamo.  He signed with the Kansas City Attack for the 1995-1996 indoor season, but on November 30, 1995, the Attack traded him to the Canton Invaders for future considerations.  In 1996, he played outdoors for the Omaha Flames.  In 1997, he played for Lincoln Brigade.  In the fall of 1997, DeFini rejoined the Omaha Flames for the USISL indoor season.  He spent the 1998 outdoor season playing for Omaha TKB in the Senior Men's Division of the Cornhusker State Games.  He finished his career in 1999 with the Charlotte Eagles.

References

Living people
All-American men's college soccer players
American soccer players
North Carolina Fusion U23 players
Charlotte Eagles players
Creighton Bluejays men's soccer players
Central California Valley Hydra players
Virginia Beach Mariners players
Kansas City Attack (NPSL) players
National Professional Soccer League (1984–2001) players
Soccer players from Ohio
USISL players
Association football forwards
Year of birth missing (living people)
Soccer players from Texas
People from McKinney, Texas